Pervert Park is a 2014 documentary film directed by Swedish-Danish filmmaking couple Frida and Lasse Barkfors. The film's focus is Palace Mobile Park in St. Petersburg, Florida, nicknamed "Pervert Park", which houses over 100 convicted sex offenders. The film premiered at Copenhagen International Documentary Festival. It won the World Cinema Documentary Special Jury Award for Impact at the 2015 Sundance Film Festival. It had a television premiere as an episode of POV on July 11, 2016.

Production
The Barkfors read an article about Florida Justice Transitions in a Danish newspaper which provoked their interest in the park, which they got the impression was "a society of its own". They visited the park for the first time in 2010 and found it to be very different from their expectations. The film took four years to make.

See also

 Miracle Village (community)
 Florida Civil Commitment Center

References

Further reading

External links
Pervert Park on the Internet Movie Database
Producer Anne Köhncke on the Internet Movie Database

2014 documentary films
2014 films
Danish documentary films
Documentary films about crime in the United States
Swedish documentary films
Films shot in Florida
Sexuality in Florida
Sex offender registries in the United States
St. Petersburg, Florida
2010s English-language films
2010s Swedish films